Szkoła (English: School) is a Polish para-documentary television series first shown on TVN from 1 September 2014.

The series is set in two fictional schools in Kraków, both named for Adam Mickiewicz - gymnasium no. 105 and lyceum no. 44. Each episode tells the story of a group of students (rarely of teachers), most commonly one from the gymnasium and one from the lyceum.

At its original conception, the series was entitled Nauczyciele (Eng: Teachers). It followed several other documentary series, including Szpital set in a hospital and Pamiętniki z Wakacji, set in the Canary Islands.

Cast

Most student characters appear only in a few episodes. The cast of teachers, however, is recurring and features the following.

Tadeusz Piotr Łomnicki as Tadeusz Chlebowski, headteacher
Maria Meyer as Maria Borkowska, deputy headteacher
Sabina Głuch as Jolanta Żabińska, Polish teacher
Joanna Litwin-Widera as Barbara Gruszka, biology teacher
Dorota Godzic as Teresa Kremer, mathematics teacher
Jagoda Pietruszkówna as Alicja Stańko, chemistry teacher
Aleksandra Żurecka as Anna Turczyn, English teacher
Karol Wolski as Piotr Gądek, IT teacher (ep. 0-125)
Rafał Kosecki as Andrzej Lesicki, physics teacher
Jan Mancewicz as Zbigniew Małek, history teacher
Wolfgang Hofer	as Dominik Huber, German teacher
Patrice Nieckowski as Patrice Nieckowski, French teacher
Konrad Pondo as Tomasz Dudziak, P.E. teacher
Małgorzata Merwart as Karina Kłosek, IT teacher (since ep. 223)

References

Television shows set in Poland
2010s Polish television series
2020s Polish television series
2014 Polish television series debuts
2020 Polish television series endings